The BFI Film & TV Database (ftvdb) is an online database created by the British Film Institute containing information related to movies, television shows, actors, production crew personnel, video games and fictional characters featured in visual entertainment media, from the UK. It was previously featured on a BFI website under this name, but on 26 June 2014, every page was changed to redirect to listings on the BFI's main site.

See also
 Allmovie
 Allmusic – a similar database, but for music
 Animator.ru - article about the Russian website
 Films considered the greatest ever

References

External links
 

Film archives in the United Kingdom
British film websites
Online film databases
Film and TV Database